The 2019 Italian Athletics Championships was the 109th edition of the Italian Athletics Championships and took place in Brixen from 26 to 28 July.

Champions

See also
2019 Italian Athletics Indoor Championships

References

External links
 All results at FIDAL web site

Italian Athletics Championships
Athletics
Italian Athletics Outdoor Championships
Athletics competitions in Italy